The Lion Fire was the 3rd largest fire of the 2011 California wildfire season. The fire, which was the result of a lightning strike, burned  of land in the Sequoia National Forest. As the fire grew it forced the evacuations of many popular campgrounds in Sequoia National Park.

References

2011 California wildfires
Sequoia National Forest
Sequoia National Park
Wildfires in Tulare County, California